Alexandru Răilean (born 4 October 1990) is a Moldavian football forward who plays for Speranța Nisporeni.

Achievements
 League Leading Goalscorer 2013–14 Moldovan "A" Division: 20 goals

Club statistics
 Total matches played in Moldavian First League: 66 matches - 6 goals

References

External links

1990 births
Moldovan footballers
Living people
FC Sfîntul Gheorghe players
FC Rapid Ghidighici players
FC Costuleni players
FC Milsami Orhei players
FC Spicul Chișcăreni players
Speranța Nisporeni players
Moldovan Super Liga players
Association football forwards